Concepts, Techniques, and Models of Computer Programming is a textbook published in 2004 about general computer programming concepts from MIT Press written by Université catholique de Louvain professor Peter Van Roy and Royal Institute of Technology, Sweden professor Seif Haridi.

Using a carefully selected progression of subsets of the Oz programming language, the book explains the most important programming concepts, techniques, and models (paradigms).

Translations of this book have been published in French (by Dunod Éditeur, 2007), Japanese (by Shoeisha, 2007) and Polish (by Helion, 2005).

External links 
 
 Official CTM site, with supplementary material
 Yves Deville et al. review
 CTM wiki

2004 non-fiction books
Computer_programming_books
Computer science books
MIT Press books